Olga Yuryevna Smorodskaya (born 7 November 1956 in Gomel) is a Russian sports executive. Since 4 August 2010, she worked as the president of FC Lokomotiv Moscow. She resigned as Lokomotiv president on 10 August 2016.

Personal life 

She is married and has two children named Anna and Lyudmila.

External links

References 

1956 births
Living people
People from Gomel